Glomeremus is a genus of African Orthopterans in the subfamily Gryllacridinae and tribe Ametroidini.

Species 
 Glomeremus brevifalcatus
 Glomeremus capitatus
 Glomeremus chimaera
 Glomeremus falcifer
 Glomeremus feanus
 Glomeremus glomerinus
 Glomeremus kilimandjaricus
 Glomeremus marginatus
 Glomeremus mediopictus
 Glomeremus nitidus
 Glomeremus obtusus
 Glomeremus orchidophilus
 Glomeremus paraorchidophilus
 Glomeremus pileatus
 Glomeremus shelfordi
 Glomeremus sphingoides
 Glomeremus sphinx
 Glomeremus tikasignatus

References

External links 

Ensifera genera
Gryllacrididae
Orthoptera of Africa